The ACT Teachers Partylist is a political party representing teachers and education sector workers with a seat in the 15th and 16th Philippine Congress, and with two seats in the 17th Philippine Congress. It is represented in the 18th Philippine Congress by educator and trade union organizer France Castro. ACT Teachers Partylist is part of the left-wing Makabayan Bloc, and is known for its active campaign for salary hikes for teachers, successful tax reduction initiatives, optional poll service duty for teachers, and lowering of optional retirement age of public school teachers.

ACT Teachers Partylist is also an active proponent of the Supreme Court cases against the Philippine government's K to 12 system, co-filing at least two K to 12-related cases in 2015, and successfully securing a temporary restraining order (TRO) against a government order that abolishes Filipino language subject in college. It also supported the abolition of the corruption-prone pork barrel system in the Philippine congress.

ACT Teachers Partylist was founded by members and affiliates of Alliance of Concerned Teachers-Philippines on January 5, 2008, in an assembly at Quezon City.

References

Party-lists represented in the House of Representatives of the Philippines
Left-wing parties in the Philippines